Prince Sam Amuka Pemu (born 13 June 1935) is a Nigerian journalist, columnist and publisher, who founded the Vanguard, Nigeria's leading newspaper, and was co-founder of The Punch, the most widely read newspaper in Nigeria. He was born in Sapele, a city in Delta State, southern Nigeria, into the family of the late Pa Amuka-Pemu and Madam Teshoma Amuka-Pemu, who died in May 2014.

Journalism career
He was a Daily Times of Nigeria editor and the first editor of the Sunday Punch before he established The Punch with his friend, the late Olu Aboderin, in 1971. He later established Vanguard Newspaper in 1983 with three other Nigerian columnists.
Amuka was described as a "Gentleman of the Press" by President Muhammadu Buhari on his 80th birthday.
He was described as an icon and a leading light in Nigerian journalism by Nduka Obaigbena, President of the Newspaper Proprietors’ Association of Nigeria.
Amuka-Pemu is the oldest practising media professional in Nigeria today who had been cited by peers. A book entitled From 1939 to the Vanguard of Modern Journalism written by Kola Muslim Animasaun, who also trained under him, acknowledged his immense contributions to journalism in Nigeria.

References

Nigerian journalists
1939 births
Living people
Nigerian columnists